Bobby Blair (born October 24, 1964) is a former professional tennis player from the United States.

Blair was one of the top junior tennis players of his country. He was an All-American at the University of Arkansas and participated in the 1986 Goodwill Games.

His highlight in the Grand Prix tennis circuit was a second round appearance at the 1985 U.S. Pro Tennis Championships in doubles, partnering with Jay Berger.

Personal life
Blair is gay. In 2014, he wrote a memoir titled Hiding Inside the Baseline about his personal journey as a gay athlete who did not come out until his late 40s.

References

External links
 
 

1964 births
Living people
American male tennis players
Sportspeople from Fort Lauderdale, Florida
Tennis people from Florida
Arkansas Razorbacks men's tennis players
Competitors at the 1986 Goodwill Games
Gay sportsmen
American LGBT sportspeople
LGBT tennis players
21st-century American LGBT people